Tim Watson (born December 23, 1974) is a former American football defensive tackle in the National Football League (NFL) for the Seattle Seahawks.  He played college football at Maryland for two seasons until he was dismissed from the team for academic reasons.  Watson would later play football at Rowan University and was drafted in the sixth round of the 2000 NFL Draft. During training camp in his rookie season Watson suffered a lacerated knee as the result of slipping on a practice sled. The practice sled had an exposed hook which managed to rip off two inches of cartilage from Watson's left knee. He was then placed on injured reserves for the entire 2000 season and waived prior to the start of the 2001 season. Watson sued the Seahawks organization claiming the team deliberately injured him. In March 2005 a state court of appeals denied a motion for a trial citing a lack of evidence. In 2017 Watson said he held no ill resentment for the Seahawks organization and was appreciative of the opportunity they gave him.

References

1974 births
Living people
American football defensive tackles
Mainland Regional High School (New Jersey) alumni
People from Linwood, New Jersey
Players of American football from New Jersey
Sportspeople from Atlantic County, New Jersey
Seattle Seahawks players